Shona Schleppe (born 27 July 1963) is a Canadian former field hockey player who competed in the 1988 Summer Olympics. She was born in Lethbridge, Alberta.

References

External links
 

1963 births
Living people
Sportspeople from Lethbridge
Canadian female field hockey players
Olympic field hockey players of Canada
Field hockey players at the 1988 Summer Olympics
Pan American Games medalists in field hockey
Pan American Games bronze medalists for Canada
Field hockey players at the 1987 Pan American Games
Medalists at the 1987 Pan American Games